Louise of Prussia (Luise Marie Elisabeth; 3 December 1838 – 23 April 1923) was Grand Duchess of Baden from 1856 to 1907 as the wife of Grand Duke Frederick I. Princess Louise was the second child and only daughter of Wilhelm I, German Emperor, and Augusta of Saxe-Weimar-Eisenach. She was the younger sister of Frederick William ("Fritz"), the future German Emperor Frederick III, and aunt of Emperor Wilhelm II.

Princess of Prussia
Louise Marie Elisabeth was born on 3 December 1838 to Prince Wilhelm of Prussia and his wife Princess Augusta of Saxe-Weimar-Eisenach. Louise was named after her grandmothers, Louise, Queen of Prussia and Grand Duchess Maria Pavlovna of Russia and was known as "Vivi" in her family. Her parents were a happy but tense couple, and Louise had only one other sibling,
Prince Frederick William, who was seven years older. Upon her birth, Augusta declared that her duty in perpetuating the Hohenzollern dynasty was complete.

While Wilhelm showed some outward affection to his only son, he lavished attention on Louise, and often his unexpected visits to her schoolroom resulted in them playing together on the floor. Mother and daughter however were not close, with Augusta's presence filling Louise up with awe; one account states that when Augusta encountered her daughter, Louise "involuntarily drew herself up to her full height, and sat stiff and constrained as for her portrait, while she inwardly trembled lest her answers should prove incorrect". In the early 1850s, Louise was educated by Adèle de Pierre of Neuchâtel.

Grand Duchess of Baden

Louise was betrothed to Frederick, Prince Regent of Baden, in 1854, and they married 20 September 1856 at Neues Palais in Potsdam. Frederick became regent because of the insanity of his brother Louis II, Grand Duke of Baden. Frederick himself was proclaimed Grand Duke when doctors declared that there was no chance of recovery. As the only daughter of the Prussian crown prince (and later emperor), their marriage caused Baden to gain a great deal of importance, and even more so once the German Empire was founded.

Within a few weeks of their marriage, the new grand duchess was already pregnant with their first child, Hereditary Grand Duke Frederick. Louise was a happy wife and mother, writing to a friend that "since we last met, my life has become so much more beautiful, more precious, to me, my happiness is so much richer and deeper than before".

Louise and Frederick disliked the stiffness of the Karlsruhe court, and gladly escaped to their castle on the island of Mainau. They were popular in Baden, and everyone spoke with affectionate pride of their grand duke and duchess in Constance, where the couple had a summer residence.

Later years

Louise was a great friend of Alice, Grand Duchess of Hesse, her sister-in-law's younger sister; i.e., Alice was the sister of Victoria, Louise's brother Frederick William's wife, both sisters being daughters of Queen Victoria.  The two often visited each other. In Queen Victoria's letters, she and Frederick were always referred to with pleasure or sympathy as good Fritz and Louise of Baden. Though friends as young girls, Louise and her sister-in-law Victoria, Princess Royal ("Vicky") always had a "none-too-friendly rivalry", particularly when comparing their children: while Vicky's eldest son Crown Prince Wilhelm was born with a deformed arm, Louise apparently could not resist bragging that her three children were healthier and bigger at the same age. Louise doted on her nephew however, and Vicky wrote to her mother that the grand duchess "spoilt him quite dreadfully". Often supporting him against his parents, her and Wilhelm's close relationship would carry on to his adulthood, and he would later write in his memoirs that Louise "possessed considerable political ability and a great gift for organisation, and she understood excellently how to put right men in the right place and how to employ their strength serviceably for the general benefit". He continued that his aunt "learned admirably to combine the Prussian element with the Baden character, and she developed into a model sovereign princess". Louise and Vicky's relations grew even more distant when the former wanted her son Crown Prince Frederick to marry Vicky's niece Princess Elisabeth of Hesse and by Rhine; the princess instead married Grand Duke Sergei Alexandrovich of Russia, and Louise felt her family had been snubbed. However, Vicky's own son, Wilhelm had too been rejected by Elisabeth, which Louise seemed unaware of.

The Austro-Prussian War caused a degree of friction between Baden and Prussia, as the former, despite their close familial connections to Berlin, chose to support the Austrians. As the daughter of the Prussian king, Baden was not included in the list of states forced to pay excessive indemnities to Prussia. Her father's strongly anti-Catholic chancellor Otto von Bismarck disliked Baden however, as it was one of Germany's most important Catholic states; he saw its religion as threatening the stability of the new German Empire. Suspicious of the grand duchess' influence on her father, he did his best to block her request for clemency on behalf of Alsace Catholics to the emperor.

Philanthropic activities
Because of her status as Grand Duchess, Louise was very involved in her duchy's charitable organizations, particularly issues concerning women. She helped found a welfare charity for women called the Baden Frauenverein, which focused on providing hospitals and homes to children. With the support of the Women's Association, Louise founded the first Badenese housewifery school in Karlsruhe, carrying on Theodor Gottlieb von Hippel the Elder's goal of women receiving special domestic training.

Louise maintained a correspondence with Florence Nightingale, who believed the grand duchess' letters could have been written by "any administrator in the Crimean War". The grand duchess also had a lifelong friendship with Clara Barton, whom she met during the Franco-Prussian War. They organized military hospitals, and helped found sewing factories for women to aid the war effort; at Louise's suggestion, Barton was awarded the Iron Cross of Merit after the war by recently crowned Emperor Wilhelm.

Despite her old age, Louise was present to welcome back wounded German soldiers upon their return to Germany from French prison camps.

Widowhood
Within two years, four of Louise's closest family members died - her father, brother, younger son and mother. Vicky, now Dowager Empress Frederick, took sympathy on Louise and persuaded her mother to confer Royal Order of Victoria and Albert, First Class, on her.

Frederick died on 28 September 1907, and their eldest son succeeded as Frederick II. That same year, their only daughter Victoria succeeded as Queen consort of Sweden.

Louise, now Dowager Grand Duchess of Baden, lived to see her duchy become absorbed into the new state of Germany under the Revolution of 1918-19 that took place at the end of World War I. At the time of the revolution, her daughter, Queen Victoria of Sweden, was visiting her. After the abdication of the German emperor, riots spread in Karlsruhe on 11 November. The son of a courtier led a group of soldiers up to the front of the palace, followed by a great crowd of people, where a few shots were fired. Louise, as well as the rest of the family, left the palace the backway and left for the Zwingenberg palace in the Neckar valley. By permission of the new government, they were allowed to stay at the Langenstein Palace, which belonged to a Swedish count, Douglas. During these events, Louise was said to have kept her calm and never uttered a word of complaint. The government gave the order that the former Grand Ducal family was to be protected, and that Langenstein be excepted from housing the returning soldiers, because Louise's daughter, the Queen of Sweden, was in their company and Baden should not do anything to offend Sweden. In 1919, the family requested permission from the government to reside in Mainau, and was met with the answer that they were now private citizens and could do as they wished.

The new republican government gave her permission to live out the rest of her life in retirement at Baden-Baden, where she died on 24 April 1923. She was the last surviving non-morganatic grandchild of Frederick William III of Prussia.

Issue
Louise and Frederick had three children:

Honours
Decorations and awards

Honorary military appointments
 Honorary colonel of the Augusta Grenadier Guards

Ancestry

References

Further reading
 Van der Kiste, John, Daughter of Prussia: Louise, Grand Duchess of Baden, and her family (A&F, CreateSpace, 2017)

External links

1838 births
1923 deaths
House of Hohenzollern
Ladies of the Royal Order of Victoria and Albert
House of Zähringen
People from Berlin
Prussian princesses
Grand Duchesses of Baden
Dames of the Order of Saint Isabel
Ladies of Justice of the Order of St John
Daughters of emperors
Daughters of kings